The rufous dog-faced bat (Molossops neglectus), is a bat species found in Argentina, Brazil, Colombia, Guyana, Peru and Suriname.

References

Further reading
 
 

Molossops
Bats of South America
Bats of Brazil
Mammals of Argentina
Mammals of Colombia
Mammals of Guyana
Mammals of Peru
Mammals of Suriname
Fauna of the Amazon
Mammals described in 1980